Let the Music Take You is a live album by David Murray. It was originally released on Marge Records in 1978 and re-released in 1993 on CD. It features a live performance by Murray, cornetist Butch Morris, bassist  Johnny Dyani and drummer George Brown recorded in concert in Rouen, France, on January 30, 1978. The album Last of the Hipman (Red, 1978) was recorded at the same concert.

Track listing
 "The Fast Life" - 12:22 
 "Monikole" (Morris) - 10:56 
 "Let The Music Take You" - 9:26 
 "The Hill" - 12:12
All compositions by David Murray except as indicated
Recorded live in Rouen, France, January 30, 1978

Personnel
David Murray: tenor saxophone
Lawrence "Butch" Morris: cornet 
Johnny Dyani: bass
George Brown: drums

References

1978 live albums
David Murray (saxophonist) live albums
Marge Records albums